This inclusive list of opera companies in Europe contains European opera companies with entries in Wikipedia plus other companies based there. Within the sections for each country, the arrangement is alphabetical by location. For a list of the most important opera companies in the world, see Lists of opera companies. For more inclusive lists of opera companies from other regions, see:
 List of Latin American and South American opera companies
 List of North American opera companies,
 List of opera companies in Africa and the Middle East
 List of opera companies in Asia, Australia, and Oceania

Albania

Armenia

Austria

Azerbaijan

Belarus

Belgium

Bosnia and Herzegovina

Bulgaria

Croatia

Cyprus

Czech Republic

Denmark

Estonia

European Union

Finland

France

Georgia

Germany

Greece

Hungary

Iceland

Republic of Ireland

Italy

Latvia

Liechtenstein

Lithuania

Luxembourg

Malta

Monaco

The Netherlands

North Macedonia

Norway

Poland

Portugal

Romania

Russia

Serbia

Slovakia

Slovenia

Spain

Sweden

Switzerland

Turkey

United Kingdom

England

Northern Ireland

Scotland

Wales

Ukraine

References

 
Companies